Hermitian varieties are in a sense a generalisation of quadrics, and occur naturally in the theory of polarities.

Definition
Let K be a field with an involutive automorphism .  Let n be an integer  and V be an (n+1)-dimensional vector space over K.

A Hermitian variety H in PG(V) is a set of points of which the representing vector lines consisting of isotropic points of a non-trivial Hermitian sesquilinear form on V.

Representation
Let  be a basis of V.  If a point p in the projective space has homogeneous coordinates  with respect to this basis, it is on the Hermitian variety if and only if :

where  and not all 

where

Tangent spaces and singularity
Let p be a point on the Hermitian variety H.  A line L through p is by definition tangent when it is contains only one point (p itself) of the variety or lies completely on the variety.  One can prove that these lines form a subspace, either a hyperplane of the full space.  In the latter case, the point is singular.

Algebraic varieties